Stenophylax is a genus of insects belonging to the family Limnephilidae.

The species of this genus are found in Europe, Eastern Asia and Northern America.

Species:
 Stenophylax alex Mey & Mueller, 1980 
 Stenophylax badukus (Mey & Mueller, 1979)

References

Limnephilidae
Insects of Europe
Insects of Asia
Insects of North America
Trichoptera genera